The Sonbarsa Raj was a medieval chieftaincy and later a zamindari (estate) during British Raj in modern-day Bihar, in erstwhile Bhagalpur district (now in Saharsa). It was controlled by the Gandhavariya Rajputs.

Beside Sonbarsa, the Gandhavarias landlords  were found in Baruari, Parsarma, Barail, Sokhpur, Jadia, Basantpur, Durgapur, Sukhsena, Bhatattan, Panchgachhia etc.

The Zamindari estate of Mangwar established by Babu Bhagwan Singh also belongs to the Gandhavaria clan, whose descendants Babu Sagar Prasad Singh lives there.

History
Sonbarsa Raj was founded by Raja Ranjit Singh in present district of Saharsa. It became powerful and very big estate in region. The Sonbarsa Raj family traces its origin from Raja Vikramaditya of Ujjain and belong to Agni branch of Kshatriya.

The grant and sanad related to Sonbarsa Raj shows that Gandhavarias were important Rajas under the Mughal and were loyal to ruling dynasty. They therefore, had played very important role in the politics of time in the region of Sarkar Tirhut of Mithila.

One of the famous zamindars of Sonbarsa was Raja Harivallabh Narayan Singh, who was honoured by King George V in the imperial Delhi durbar held in 1911 and was provided a royal chair along with the other royalty of India.

See also
Zamindars of Bihar

References

Villages in Saharsa district
Zamindari estates
Rajput estates